James Stewart Ayre (August 15, 1881 – 1953) was a businessman and political figure in Newfoundland. He represented Port de Grave in the Newfoundland and Labrador House of Assembly from 1932 to 1933.

He was born in St. John's and educated at the Methodist College there and at Liverpool College in England. After completing his education, he entered the family business in 1898, becoming a director in 1914 and chairman of the board in 1937. Ayre was also president of the Newfoundland Clothing Company.

He ran unsuccessfully for a seat in the Newfoundland assembly in 1924 and in 1928 before being elected in 1932. Ayre resigned his seat in 1933. He served in the Newfoundland Executive Council as a minister without portfolio. Ayre died in St. John's in 1953.

References 

Members of the Newfoundland and Labrador House of Assembly
1881 births
1953 deaths
Government ministers of the Dominion of Newfoundland
People educated at Liverpool College